Help Crafter is a Macintosh-based help authoring tool published by US-based company Putercraft LLC. It outputs a native Mac help bundle to be included in Mac applications.

The latest release is version 2.0. It is available from the Apple App Store.

Description

Help Crafter is a help authoring tool for Macintosh desktop applications. It allows users to create individual pages using its text editor, and organize pages in a tree structure. Each page can contain keywords and an abstract that allows users to find content anywhere in the Apple Help Viewer system application.

See also
 List of help authoring tools
 User assistance

External links 
 

Technical communication
Technical communication tools
Online help